Said Ali (born October 26, 1980) is a Jordanian-born Canadian former soccer player who began his career in 2004 with Pittsburgh Riverhounds in the USL Pro Select League. After a successful season in the USL Pro Select League he managed to play in the USL First Division with the Vancouver Whitecaps, and the Toronto Lynx. He would later conclude his career in the Canadian Soccer League with the Serbian White Eagles, and Hamilton Croatia.

Playing career

College soccer
Ali began playing soccer at the college level in 2002 while attending Robert Morris University. In his first season with Robert Morris he was named to the All-Northeast Conference first team after contributing 11 goals and 3 assists. The following season he netted in 13 goals and recorded four assists, and for the second consecutive year was named to the All-Northeast Conference first team.

Professional career
In 2004, he transitioned to the professional realm after signing with Pittsburgh Riverhounds in the USL Pro Soccer League. Where in his rookie season he finished as the team's top goalscorer with 15 goals, and finished second in league scoring. He helped Pittsburgh win their first Conference title, but were eliminated in the semifinals by the Charlotte Eagles. Once the season came to a conclusion Ali was named the USL Pro Soccer League Rookie of the Year, and throughout the season he was also named to the PSL Team of the Week eight times including Player of the Week once. On February 8, 2005 the Vancouver Whitecaps FC announced the signing of Ali to a one-year deal with an option. Throughout the season he made minimal appearances, and as a result was traded midway through the season to the Toronto Lynx in return for Josue Mayard.

During his tenure in Toronto he featured in 15 matches, and recorded an assist. In 2008, he featured in the Canadian Soccer League with the Serbian White Eagles FC. He contributed by assisting the White Eagles in claiming their first CSL Championship by defeating the Trois-Rivières Attak 2-1 on penalties. In 2010, he played with Hamilton Croatia, and made his debut for the club on May 15, 2010 in a match against TFC Academy. He recorded his first goal for the club on June 25, 2010 in 6-1 victory over St. Catharines Wolves.

Personal life 
Ali was born in Jordan, and played with the Jordan national under-16 football team from 1994 till 1995. He immigrated to Canada in 1996 where he settled in Hamilton, Ontario, and became a citizen in 1998.

Honors

Player 
Serbian White Eagles 
CSL Championship:
 2008

References

Living people
1980 births
Soccer players from Hamilton, Ontario
Canadian soccer players
Canadian expatriate soccer players
Association football forwards
Pittsburgh Riverhounds SC players
Robert Morris Colonials men's soccer players
Vancouver Whitecaps (1986–2010) players
Toronto Lynx players
Serbian White Eagles FC players
USL First Division players
USL Second Division players
Canadian Soccer League (1998–present) players
Sportspeople from Tripoli, Lebanon
Jordanian emigrants to Canada
Canadian people of Jordanian descent
Hamilton Croatia players